Bitch (born Karen Mould; March 30, 1973), also known as Capital B, is an American musician, actress, composer, and performance artist. Best known for her work in Bitch and Animal, John Cameron Mitchell's Shortbus, her work with Canadian folk musician Ferron, and her new project BEACH. Bitch sings and plays numerous instruments, including the ukulele, bass guitar, violin, and keytar—the artist has described her music as "electric violin poet rock".

Bitch and Animal 1996–2004 

Bitch and Animal recorded their first album, What's That Smell? in Seattle, with Kate Wolf (Julie Wolf's twin sister) in the months leading up to the Amherst show. Their first meeting with Ani Difranco was the official release of their first album. Difranco then took the two on tour with her and signed them to her label. They recorded an album, Eternally Hard in Difranco's home studio in Buffalo, New York, finished it in Wayne Schrengohst's home studio in Manhattan, and Righteous Babe released it on September 11, 2001. Bitch and Animal went on to make two records for Righteous Babe Records, and toured extensively in the US, Europe and Canada.

Discography
Bitch and Animal
 What's That Smell (1999) self-released
 Eternally Hard (2001) Righteous Babe Records
 Sour Juice and Rhyme (2003) Righteous Babe Records
Bitch solo recordings:
 Be-Sides, one take wonders and poems (2005) self-released
 Make This Break This (2006) Kill Rock Stars
 B+TEC (2008) Bitch +The Exciting Conclusion Short Story Records
 Blasted! (2010) Short Story Records
 In Us We Trust (2013) Short Story Records
 Bitchcraft (2022) Kill Rock Stars

References

External links 
 
 Bitch at Kill Rock Stars
 Bitch's label, Short Story Records
 Bitch's album with Ferron
 Bitch and Animal on Righteous Babe Records

American feminists
DePaul University alumni
American lesbian musicians
Living people
People from Monroeville, Pennsylvania
Place of birth missing (living people)
Queercore musicians
Lesbian feminists
1973 births
Feminist musicians
American multi-instrumentalists
Musicians from Pennsylvania
Radical feminists
21st-century American women musicians
Women in punk